Curious Buddies is a series of direct-to-video specials narrated by Cathy Richardson. It was produced by Spiffy Pictures for Nickelodeon. The series was released across seven videos from August 31, 2004, to April 12, 2005.

The series is aimed at babies and toddlers, and it was launched as a competitor to the Baby Einstein line. Every video was written with the supervision of developmental psychologist Rachel Barr, and the DVDs feature a voiceover from Barr. The main characters are five animal puppets that were built by Rollie Krewson (known for her work with The Muppets).

One of the DVDs, "Helping at Home", was the recipient of a Spring 2005 Parents' Choice Award.

Summary
Dog, Cat, Bear, Pig and Elephant are the Curious Buddies, a group of five animal puppets who have fun exploring the world around them. Every episode features real-life kids helping the puppets and original music clips.

According to a New York Post article, Curious Buddies was designed as an alternative to the successful Baby Einstein series. To differentiate itself, Curious Buddies features a pop song soundtrack (instead of the classical music found in Baby Einstein) and videos of real-life situations rather than indoor close-ups of toys.

Episodes
Nine episodes were made.

References

External links
Official website

Direct-to-video television series
American television shows featuring puppetry
Television series about bears
Television series about cats
Television shows about dogs
Television series about elephants
Television series about pigs